The Congolese Union of Republicans is a minor political party in the Republic of Congo. It contested the 2002 Congolese presidential election.

References

Political parties in the Republic of the Congo